The 1990 Oregon gubernatorial election took place on November 7, 1990. Democratic nominee Barbara Roberts defeated Republican David B. Frohnmayer and Independent Al Mobley to win the election.

Candidates

Democratic 
 Barbara Roberts, Oregon Secretary of State

Republican 
 David Frohnmayer, Oregon Attorney General
 John Lim

Independent 
 Al Mobley, social conservative activist

Results

References

1990
Gubernatorial
Oregon